Katherine Calder (born 1980) is a cross-country skier from New Zealand who has competed since 1999. At the 2010 Winter Olympics in Vancouver, she finished 47th in the individual sprint event and 63rd in the 10 km events while not starting the 7.5 km + 7.5 km double pursuit events.

Calder's best finish at the FIS Nordic World Ski Championships was 43rd in the 30 km event at Liberec in 2009.

Her best World Cup finish was 43rd in a 10 km event at Canada in 2008.

References

1980 births
Cross-country skiers at the 2010 Winter Olympics
Living people
New Zealand female cross-country skiers
Olympic cross-country skiers of New Zealand
20th-century New Zealand women
21st-century New Zealand women